Aaron Sorkin is an American writer, director and producer known for his work in film, television and theatre.

Sorkin is known for the television series, Sports Night (1998-2000), The West Wing (1999-2006), Studio 60 on the Sunset Strip (2006-2007), and The Newsroom (2013-2015). For The West Wing, Sorkin received five Primetime Emmy Awards. He is also known for writing the screenplays for the films, A Few Good Men (1992), The American President (1995), Charlie Wilson's War (2007), The Social Network (2010), Moneyball (2011), and Steve Jobs (2015). Sorkin received the Academy Award for Best Adapted Screenplay for The Social Network. Sorkin wrote and directed Molly's Game (2017), and The Trial of the Chicago Seven (2020).

Sorkin made his Broadway debut in 1989 with A Few Good Men. He followed it up with his original play The Farnsworth Invention (2007) and with the stage adaptation of Harper Lee's To Kill a Mockingbird  in 2018 starring Jeff Daniels as Atticus Finch. The latter play ran for a year with Daniels in the lead role and received nine Tony Award nominations.

Major associations

Academy Awards

British Academy Film Awards

Golden Globe Awards

Primetime Emmy Awards

Guild awards

Directors Guild of America Award

Writers Guild of America Awards

Critics awards

Critics' Choice Movie Awards

Detroit Film Critics Society Awards

References 

Sorkin, Aaron
Sorkin, Aaron